The Puerto Rican hutia (Isolobodon portoricensis) is an extinct species of rodent in the family Capromyidae. It was found on Hispaniola (today the Dominican Republic and Haiti) and Gonâve Island; it was introduced to the Virgin Islands and Puerto Rico.

History
The Puerto Rican hutia was believed to be a vital food source for the Taíno for many years; despite this, they continued to survive until the arrival of early European explorers. Christopher Columbus and his crew are believed to have eaten the species upon their arrival. The species declined following European colonization of the West Indies. It is unclear whether it survived after facing threats from the early introduction of black rats (Rattus rattus) by the first European settlers around 1500, although it may have been finally wiped out by introduced small Indian mongooses (Urva auropunctata) in the 19th or early 20th century. Although commonly regarded as extinct, some researchers hold out hopes that the species still survives in undisturbed refuges.

Sources

Isolobodon
EDGE species
Extinct animals of the United States
Extinct animals of Haiti
Extinct animals of the Dominican Republic
Mammals of Hispaniola
Mammals of the Dominican Republic
Mammals of Haiti
Mammals of Puerto Rico
Mammals of the Caribbean
Rodent extinctions since 1500
Mammals described in 1916
Taxonomy articles created by Polbot